Catherine Lord (born 1949) is an American artist, writer, curator, social activist, professor, scholar exploring themes of feminism, cultural politics and colonialism. In 2010, she was awarded the Harvard Arts Medal.

Early life and education

Born in Dominica, she attended a British boarding school in Barbados. When she was 13, she moved to Iowa with her family.

While attending Radcliffe College, where she majored in English, she worked as a research assistant at the Schlesinger Library.  She earned her Master's of Fine Arts degree in photography and the history of photography at the Visual Studies Workshop, an artists' organization allied with the State University of New York at Buffalo. Lord also edited Afterimage, a journal of photography, film, and video.

Work

Her work includes The Effect of Tropical Light on White Men and "text/image project". She edited the catalogue for an exhibition of lesbian art, "All but the Obvious".

Curated work 

Lord has curated a number of exhibitions, including:"Pervert," "Trash,"  “Gender, fucked,” and "Memories of Overdevelopment:  Philippine Diaspora in Contemporary Visual Art."

Published work 
Lord published an experimental narrative, The Summer of Her Baldness: A Cancer Improvisation, where she shares her experience of gender during chemotherapy.

Film 
In 2021, she was one of the participants in John Greyson's experimental short documentary film International Dawn Chorus Day.

Academic career

For seven years, Lord served as dean of the school of art at the California Institute of the Arts. 1990–1995, she was the chairman of the art department at UC Irvine. 1991–1996, Lord was the director of the UCI Gallery at that institution.

Gallery exhibitions at UCI

From October 3 through November 7, "And 22 Million Very Tired and Very Angry People" was an installation by Carrie Mae Weems.  In winter quarter, January 7 through February 4, "Convergence: Eight Photographers", which was organized by Deborah Willis, curator of the Schoenberg Center of Black American Art in New York. It showcased black artists' perspective.

Awards

In 2008, she was named the Shirley Carter Burden Visiting Professor of Photography at Harvard University. In 2010, she received the Harvard Arts Medal.

Fellowships

Lord has received many fellowships.  They include New York State Council on the Arts, the Humanities Research Institute of the University of California, the Royal Botanic Gardens at Kew, the Norton Family Foundation, the Andy Warhol Foundation, the Creative Capital Foundation, the Durfee Foundation, the Rockefeller Center for Arts and Humanities, the California Community Foundation and Anonymous Was a Woman.

Panels

At the Exquisite Acts & Everyday Rebellions: 2007 CalArts Feminist Art Symposium, Lord spoke on the panel "Strategies for Contemporary Feminism".

Further reading

 The Summer of Her Baldness: A Cancer Improvisation (University of Texas Press, 2004) 
 The conceptual translation Sa Calvitie, Son Colibri: Miss Translation (L’une Bevue) 
 Art and Queer Culture, 1885-2005 (in collaboration with Richard Meyer) (Phaidon Press, 2011).

References

1949 births
Living people
21st-century American writers
21st-century American women writers
Radcliffe College alumni
American women curators
American curators